Florian Dumitrescu (born 27 October 1946) is a Romanian football forward. In the 1970–1971 European Cup, Dumitrescu scored UTA's decisive goal that eliminated Feyenoord who were European champions at that time.

International career
Florian Dumitrescu played four games at international level for Romania including qualification matches for Euro 1972 and World Cup 1974. He also appeared once for Romania's Olympic team in a 2–1 victory against Albania at the 1972 Summer Olympics qualifiers.

Honours
UTA Arad
Divizia A: 1968–69, 1969–70
Dinamo București
Divizia A: 1972–73
Petrolul Ploiești
Divizia B: 1976–77

Notes

References

External links

Florian Dumitrescu at Labtof.ro

1946 births
Living people
Romanian footballers
Romania international footballers
Association football forwards
Liga I players
Liga II players
FC Dinamo București players
FC Steaua București players
FC UTA Arad players
FC Petrolul Ploiești players
FC Olt Scornicești players
Footballers from Bucharest